The Lost Colony or Roanoke Colony was the first English colony in the New World, which was abandoned and the colonists never found.

Lost Colony may also refer to:
 Lost Colony (play), a play based on the history of Roanoke Colony
 Artemis Fowl: The Lost Colony (2006), a fantasy novel by Eoin Colfer
 Deadlands: Lost Colony, a tabletop role-playing game published by Pinnacle Entertainment Group
 Wraiths of Roanoke or Lost Colony, a 2007 supernatural film about the English colony
 "The Lost Colony", a 1993 episode of the Lovejoy
 Lost Colony Entertainment, an American-based production company

See also
 Fort Raleigh National Historic Site, which commemorates Roanoke Colony
 Jamestown: Legend of the Lost Colony, a 2011 video game